Folami may refer to:

 Ben Folami (born 1999), Australian professional footballer
 Folami Ideraabdullah, American geneticist and assistant professor